Orland is a town in Hancock County, Maine, United States. The population was 2,221 at the 2020 census.

Geography

Demographics

2010 census

At the 2010 census there were 2,225 people, 976 households, and 627 families living in the town. The racial makeup of the town was 97.3% White, 0.1% African American, 0.5% Native American, 0.3% Asian, 0.5% from other races, and 1.3% from two or more races. Hispanic or Latino of any race were 1.2%.

Of the 976 households 24.3% had children under the age of 18 living with them, 50.7% were married couples living together, 9.0% had a female householder with no husband present, 4.5% had a male householder with no wife present, and 35.8% were non-families. 27.9% of households were one person and 8% were one person aged 65 or older. The average household size was 2.25 and the average family size was 2.70.

The median age in the town was 47.3 years. 17.3% of residents were under the age of 18; 7.9% were between the ages of 18 and 24; 20.5% were from 25 to 44; 38.5% were from 45 to 64; and 15.7% were 65 or older. The gender makeup of the town was 50.0% male and 50.0% female.

2000 census

At the 2000 census there were 2,127 people, 867 households, and 630 families living in the town. The racial makeup of the town was 98.27% White, 0.14% Native American, 0.23% Asian, 0.09% from other races, and 1.27% from two or more races. Hispanic or Latino of any race were 0.37%.

Of the 880 households 31.5% had children under the age of 18 living with them, 57.4% were married couples living together, 9.7% had a female householder with no husband present, and 28.4% were non-families. 22.2% of households were one person and 6.5% were one person aged 65 or older.  The average household size was 2.42 and the average family size was 2.82.

The age distribution was 24.0% under the age of 18, 5.7% from 18 to 24, 29.6% from 25 to 44, 27.8% from 45 to 64, and 12.8% 65 or older.  The median age was 40 years. For every 100 females, there were 98.9 males.  For every 100 females age 18 and over, there were 92.3 males.

The median household income was $39,345 and the median family income  was $45,875. Males had a median income of $36,435 versus $23,571 for females. The per capita income for the town was $19,551.  About 8.5% of families and 11.2% of the population were below the poverty line, including 18.3% of those under age 18 and 4.2% of those age 65 or over.

Notable people

 Phinehas Barnes (1811–1871), newspaper editor, corporate attorney, and state legislator; born in Orland in 1811
 Walter Van Tilburg Clark, author and poet, best known for the novel The Oxbow Incident, which was made into a 1943 film
 Edwin Ginn, publisher, peace advocate, philanthropist
 Samuel Harriman, Union Army Brigadier General

Town government 

Selectmen/Town Meeting

References

Towns in Hancock County, Maine
Towns in Maine